Edward Lewis Gaylord  (May 28, 1919April 27, 2003) was an American billionaire businessman, media mogul and philanthropist. He was the founder of the Gaylord Entertainment Company that included The Oklahoman newspaper, Oklahoma Publishing Co., Gaylord Hotels, the Nashville Network TV Channel (later renamed "SpikeTV","Spike" and Paramount Network after being sold off); the Grand Ole Opry, and the Country Music Television Channel (CMT) as well as the defunct Opryland USA theme park and a bankrupt airline, Western Pacific Airlines.

Early life
Gaylord was born on May 28, 1919, in Oklahoma City, Oklahoma. His father, Edward King Gaylord, was the owner of The Daily Oklahoman.

Gaylord graduated from Stanford University in 1941, where he earned a degree in business. He attended the Harvard Business School and served in the United States Army during World War II.

Career
Gaylord began his career for Oklahoma Publishing in 1946. He inherited a controlling interest in The Daily Oklahoman upon his father's death in 1974. He purchased the Grand Ole Opry in Nashville, Tennessee, when it was in dire financial straits and kept it operating. He created The Nashville Network TV Channel, as well as Country Music Television, or CMT, which is similar to MTV, and owned Hee Haw, a long-running country and western variety show. He was also an investor in Texas Rangers at the same time as George W. Bush. Gaylord served as the chairman of the Gaylord Entertainment Company until February 2003.

Gaylord was the president of the Southern Newspaper Publishers Association. He also served on the board of directors of the American Newspaper Publishers Association. As the publisher of The Oklahoman, he consistently took conservative political positions in opposition to government spending, but at the same time the paper was sometimes accused of improperly dealing with conflicts of interests created by Gaylord's personal financial interests. One example was the paper's editorial support for the city to use public funds to promote the building of a new Bass Pro Shop in Oklahoma City, while Gaylord Entertainment was then a 19.9% shareholder of Bass Pro stock.  The Oklahoman'''s reporting on this topic again drew criticism from the Columbia Journalism Review. He was also a member of the conservative public policy think tank, Council for National Policy.

Philanthropy
The Gaylord family of Oklahoma City helped found the National Cowboy & Western Heritage Museum in Oklahoma City and has given the University of Oklahoma contributions totaling over $50 million in the last three decades, and founded the Gaylord College of Journalism and Mass Communication. The home field of the University of Oklahoma Sooners football team was renamed Gaylord Family Oklahoma Memorial Stadium due to their contributions.

Personal life, death and legacy
Gaylord had several children, including Edward King Gaylord II, Mary Gaylord McClean, Louise Gaylord Bennett and Christy Gaylord Everest.

Gaylord died of cancer on April 27, 2003, in Oklahoma City, Oklahoma. His funeral was held at the National Cowboy & Western Heritage Museum.

The Daily Oklahoman remained being controlled by the family until the sale in 2011; the news features and editorial position of the paper reflect affiliation with The Washington Examiner'', which has the same owner. Edward L. Gaylord's daughters Christy Gaylord Everest and Louise Gaylord Bennett remain as board members. Both sought an updated look for the paper and seemed to present more frequent opposing viewpoints of issues of public concern.

The company that bore his name, Gaylord Entertainment Company, transitioned into a real estate investment trust in 2012. As part of a long-term contract giving Marriott International the rights to manage its hotels and adjacent attractions, the company was renamed Ryman Hospitality Properties. The Gaylord name transferred to Marriott, and now exists as a brand known as Gaylord Hotels, though RHP continues to own the physical properties.

Awards and honors
1974 - Oklahoma Hall of Fame
1985 - Golden Plate Award of the American Academy of Achievement. Gaylord was the Host of the 1988 Achievement Summit at the Opryland Resort in Nashville.

Notes and references

1919 births
2003 deaths
Asheville School alumni
Stanford Graduate School of Business alumni
Harvard Business School alumni
University of Oklahoma people
United States Army personnel of World War II
American billionaires
Gaylord family
Businesspeople from Oklahoma City
Oklahoma Republicans
Deaths from cancer in Oklahoma
Ryman Hospitality Properties
20th-century American businesspeople
20th-century American philanthropists
Philanthropists from Oklahoma